Henri Thellin (27 August 1931 – 17 September 2006) was a Belgian footballer. He played in 16 matches for the Belgium national football team from 1958 to 1961.

References

External links
 

1931 births
2006 deaths
Belgian footballers
Belgium international footballers
Place of birth missing
Association footballers not categorized by position